The Commission scolaire Jérôme-Le Royer was a Catholic school board located on the Island of Montreal in Quebec, Canada. It oversaw French and English schools in the former independent municipalities of Anjou, Saint-Leonard, and Montreal-Est as well as the city of Montreal's borough of Pointe-aux-Trembles

It was abolished by the government of Quebec on July 1, 1998, as part of a general transition from school boards representing religious communities to those representing linguistic communities. The English schools were transferred to the English Montreal School Board, and the French schools were transferred to the Commission scolaire de la Pointe-de-l'Île.

Schools
Schools included:

Francophone secondary schools: 
 École secondaire Antoine-de-St-Exupéry
 École secondaire d'Anjou
 École secondaire Daniel-Johnson
 École secondaire de la Lancée
 École secondaire de la Pointe-aux-Trembles
 École secondaire Le Tournesol
 École secondaire Pie-XII

Anglophone secondary schools:
 John-Paul I High School
 Laurier-Macdonald High School

Francophone primary schools:
 École primaire Albatros
 École primaire Alphonse-Pesant
 École primaire Ami Soleil
 École primaire Cardinal-Léger
 École primaire Chénier
 École primaire Des Roseraies
 École primaire Félix-Leclerc
 École primaire François-La Bernade
 École primaire Gabrielle-Roy
 École primaire Jacques-Rousseau
 École primaire La Dauversière
 École primaire Lambert-Closse
 École primaire Montmartre
 École primaire Notre-Dame
 École primaire René-Pelletier
 École primaire Ste-Germaine-Cousin
 École primaire St-Joseph
 École primaire St-Marcel
 École primaire Ste-Marguerite-Bourgeoys
 École primaire Ste-Maria-Goretti
 École primaire St-Octave
 École primaire Victor-Lavigne
 École primaire Wilfrid-Bastien
 École primaire Wilfrid-Pelletier

Anglophone primary schools:
 Dante Elementary School
 Honoré Mercier Elementary School
 McLearon Elementary School
 Pierre de Coubertin Elementary School
 Tara Hall Elementary School

Former schools
Schools closed prior to the district's dissolution:
 Aime Renaud High School
 Roussin Academy High School

References

External links
  

Historical school districts in Quebec
Education in Montreal